The name Damrey (Khmer: ដំរី, [ɗɑm.ˈrəj]) has been used for four tropical cyclones in the Western Pacific basin. The name, submitted by Cambodia, means "elephant" in the Khmer language.
 Typhoon Damrey (2000) (T0001, 01W, Asiang) – first name used from the WMO and strongest storm in 2000.
 Typhoon Damrey (2005) (T0518, 17W, Labuyo) – most powerful storm to affect Hainan in over 30 years.
 Typhoon Damrey (2012) (T1210, 11W) – the strongest to affect the area north of the Yangtze River since 1949.
 Typhoon Damrey (2017) (T1723, 28W, Ramil) – affected Vietnam.

Pacific typhoon set index articles